Enrique Álvarez may refer to:
 Enrique Álvarez Conde (1952–2019), Spanish academic
 Enrique Álvarez Córdova (1930–1980), Salvadoran politician and statesman 
 Enrique Alvarez Diosdado (1910–1983), Spanish actor
 Enrique Álvarez Félix (1934–1996), Mexican actor

See also
 Enrique Alférez (1901–1999), Mexican-American artist